Otto A. Boehler (October 15, 1873 – October 15, 1910) was a United States Army private who received the Medal of Honor for actions during the Philippine–American War.

Biography
Otto Boehler was born October 15, 1873, in Germany.

He was one of Young's Scouts, who received one of 6 Medals of Honor presented for members of Young's Scouts on  May 16, 1899, led that day by Captain William E. Birkhimer of the 3rd US Artillery.

Private Boehler is buried in the St. Mary's Catholic Church in Breckenridge Minnesota.

Medal of Honor citation
Rank and Organization: Private, Company I, 1st North Dakota Volunteer Infantry. Place and Date: Near San Isidro, Philippine Islands, May 16, 1899. Entered Service At: Wahpeton, N. Dak. Birth: Germany. Date of Issue: May 17, 1906.

Citation:

With 21 other scouts charged across a burning bridge, under heavy fire, and completely routed 600 of the enemy who were entrenched in a strongly fortified position.

See also

List of Medal of Honor recipients
List of Philippine–American War Medal of Honor recipients

References

German-born Medal of Honor recipients
United States Army Medal of Honor recipients
United States Army soldiers
Emigrants from the German Empire to the United States
1873 births
1910 deaths
People from North Dakota
American military personnel of the Philippine–American War
Philippine–American War recipients of the Medal of Honor